"Concrete Heart" is a song recorded by Australian singer/songwriter Vassy, featuring American duo Disco Fries. The track became Vassy's sixth number-one single in the United States on Billboard's Dance Club Songs chart, reaching the summit in its June 8, 2019 issue, as well as her fourth top ten on the Dance/Mix Show Airplay chart, while it became the first top ten on both charts for Disco Fries.

Background
In an interview with Billboard, Vassy described that “‘Concrete Heart’ is a very special record, dedicated to my father who passed away 16 years ago. I really wanted to grow as an artist and focus more on a sound that's authentic to me. I felt a little vulnerable putting out the record, as it's a song about being afraid to get hurt, being afraid of rejection, of having the right to love whomever you want no matter who you are, having that equal opportunity. I didn't know how people would take it, so to see it get received so well inspires me to continue my artistry. As I always say, rejections are simply re-directions.”

Track listings
Digital download
"Concrete Heart" – 3:02

Charts

Weekly charts

Year-end charts

References

External links
Official Video at YouTube

2019 songs
2019 singles
Songs written by Vassy (singer)
Columbia Records singles
Sony Music singles
Vassy (singer) songs
Commemoration songs